Fair Control was a German group that was formed in 1984 by German bassist Hannes Schöner and keyboardist Bernd Göke. The duo was known for its only singles "Symphony of Love", "Angel Eyes" and "We Can Fly Together".

Discography

Albums
 2009 The Single & Maxi Collection 84-86 (Ariola Records)

German musical duos
German new wave musical groups
New wave duos